Warracknabeal is a wheatbelt town in the Australian state of Victoria. Situated on the banks of the Yarriambiack Creek, 330 km north-west of Melbourne, it is the business and services centre of the northern Wimmera and southern Mallee districts, and hosts local government offices of the Shire of Yarriambiack. At the  Warracknabeal district had a population of 2,745, of which 2,340 lived in the town.

History
The original inhabitants of the area around Warracknabeal were the Wotjobaluk tribe of Aboriginal people. The town's name is believed to derive from an Aboriginal expression meaning "place of big gums shading the water hole". The earliest European settlers in the area included Andrew and Robert Scott, who established the first run of the name.

The Post Office opened on 1 September 1861 and was known as Werracknebeal until 1885.

Amongst the historical buildings are an 1872 prison cell built from red and yellow gum, a Tudor-style post office, several 19th-century hotels and pubs, and a four-storey water tower from 1886. There is also an agricultural machinery museum housing pieces from the history of farming in the Mallee and Wimmera districts.

The Warracknabeal Magistrates' Court closed on 1 January 1990.

Localities
The Warracknabeal bounded locality includes the rural neighbourhoods of Batchica  (whose post office opened as Yellangip South in 1908, was renamed Batchica in 1909 and closed in 1931), Challambra  (whose post office opened as Challamba Dam (sic) around 1902, was renamed Challamba in 1905 and closed in 1918) and Mellis  (whose post office opened around 1907 and closed in 1954).

Traditional ownership
The formally recognised traditional owners for the area in which Warracknabeal sits are the Wotjobaluk, Jaadwa, Jadawadjali, Wergaia and Jupagik Nations. These Nations are represented by the Barengi Gadjin Land Council Aboriginal Corporation.

Demographics
As of the 2016 census, 2,438 people resided in Warracknabeal. The median age of persons in Warracknabeal was 50 years. Children aged 0–14 years made up 16% of the population. People over the age of 65 years made up 27.8 percent of the population. There are slightly more females than males with 50.2% of the population female and 49.8% male. The average household size is 2.1 persons per household. The average number of children per family for families with children is 1.9.

82.6% of people were born in Australia. Of persons living in Warracknabeal, 1.5% (36 persons) were Aboriginal and/or Torres Strait Islander people. This is higher than for the state of Victoria (0.8%) but lower than the national average (2.8%). The most common ancestries in Warracknabeal were Australian 33.0%, English 30.6%, Scottish 7.7%, Irish 7.2% and German 7.1%.

Of the people aged 15 and over, 10% reported having completed year 12 as their highest level of educational attainment. This is lower than the state average 15.9% and the national average of 15.7%.

In the 2016 census just over half (54.0%) of the population of Warracknabeal reported being employed full time, 34.9% part-time, 6.1% were away from work and 5% were unemployed. Of those people over the age of 15 and employed, 40.4% work 40 hours or more per week. The hospital industry employs the largest number of people in Warracknabeal (15.0%). The median total family income was $1,194 per week, and median household income was $870.

Almost a third (31.8%) of people in Warracknabeal reported doing voluntary work through an organisation or group in the 12 months before the election. This is higher than the state (19.2%) and national averages (19.0).

Median weekly rent was $150, and median monthly mortgage repayments were $758. Almost half (49.4%) own their home outright. Private dwellings in Warracknabeal tend to be separate houses (93.5%). Most of these have three bedrooms (57.2%). 
Just over two-thirds (67.5%) of household have at least one person access the internet from their dwelling. This is lower than the state (83.7%) and national (83.2%).

Healthcare
The town is serviced by three doctors and one pharmacy. Hospital services are provided by Rural Northwest Health. The town also has an osteopath.

Schools
The town has four schools: Warracknabeal Secondary College, Warracknabeal Primary School, St Mary's Catholic Primary School and Warracknabeal Special Developmental School.

Sport
The town has an Australian rules football team (Warrack Eagles) competing in the Wimmera Football League.

Warrack Eagles Netball Club competes in the Wimmera Netball Association.

The town has two teams that compete in the Dimboola Tennis Association competition as of 2015: Warracknabeal Gold and Warracknabeal Maroon.

The horse racing club – the Wimmera Racing Club – schedules around six race meetings a year at Warracknabeal, including the Warracknabeal Cup meeting every Easter Saturday. It also has the Sheep Hills Race Club, which schedules two race meetings a year, including the Sheep Hills Cup meeting in February.

Golfers play at the Warracknabeal Golf Club on the town's north-eastern outskirts.

Warracknabeal has a cricket team (St Mary's Cricket Club) in the Wimmera Mallee Cricket Association. It has three hockey teams: a senior men's team (Hoops), a women's team, and a mixed junior team (Revengers), who were winners of the 2011 premiership.

Warracknabeal also has a roller derby team called the Wheat City Derby Angels. They participate in tournaments around Victoria.

Governance

Warracknabeal is the seat of government for the Shire of Yarriambiack. It is also the administrative centre. The council offices are located in Lyle Street.

The former town hall and theatre complex (built 1939-40), added to the Victorian Heritage Register in 2009, is now used for civic purposes.

Easter Y-Fest
Y-Fest incorporates an Easter Saturday Street Parade, a 3 Day Vintage Machinery Rally at Wheatlands Museum, 4 Day Golf Tournament, 3-day Art Show, Easter Saturday Race Meeting and Waterski Spectacular.  The town of 2400 people swells with many visitors, friends and family and offers many family and rich community events every year.

The Easter Y-Fest is in its twenty-fifth year (2013) and continues to grow stronger as the individual events that make up Y-Fest, benefit from the joint marketing efforts of the Y-Fest Promotions Committee Inc.  This Committee, made up of representatives from each of the individual event committees and Council, was formed as a marketing group to promote the Y-Fest concept and has been successful in boosting attendances at all venues.

Notable people
Arts and media

 Jack Hibberd (born 1940), playwright
 Nick Cave (born 1957), musician

Military
 Linden Cameron MC (1918–1986), Australian army officer
 John (Jack) O'Dea (1920-1993), Lt Col, AFL ACT Hall of Fame 

Politics
 Thomas d'Alton (1895–1968), politician
 Jack Ginifer (1927–1982), Labor politician
 Bernie Dunn (born 1944), National politician

Sport
 Ken Smale (born 1933), Australian rules footballer
 John Hayes (1939), Australian rules footballer
 Graeme Clyne (born 1941), Australian rules footballer
 Russell Crow (born 1941), Australian rules footballer
 Andy Wilson (born 1951), Australian rules footballer
 Graeme Schultz (born 1953), Australian rules footballer
 Lauren Hewitt (born 1978), Olympic track and field medalist
 Jeremy Clayton (born 1981), Australian rules footballer
 Natalie Medhurst (born 1984), netballer 
 Matt Rosa (born 1986), Australian rules footballer
 Kyle Cheney (born 1989), Australian rules footballer

See also
 Warracknabeal Airport
 Warracknabeal Cemetery

References

External links

 Warracknabeal Herald
 Warracknabeal Secondary College
 Warracknabeal's Easter Y-Fest Website

Towns in Victoria (Australia)
Wimmera
Warracknabeal